The 1956 NAIA basketball tournament was held in March at Municipal Auditorium in Kansas City, Missouri. The 19th annual NAIA basketball tournament featured 32 teams playing in a single-elimination format. 1956 would be the last tournament with unseeded teams. 

The championship game featured McNeese State University and Texas Southern University. It was the first and only appearance for the McNeese State made in the NAIA tournament. The Cowboys beat the Tigers, 60–55.

The third-place game featured Pittsburg State who defeated the Wheaton Thunder, 77–70. This tournament featured six all-time leading scorers.

Awards and honors
Many of the records set by the 1956 tournament have been broken, and many of the awards were established much later:
Leading scorer est. 1963
Leading rebounder est. 1963
Charles Stevenson Hustle Award est. 1958
Player of the Year est. 1994 
Top single-game performances: Jim Spivey of Southeastern Oklahoma vs State Georgia Southern. Spivey scored 17 field goals 9 free throws, totaling 43 points.
Most free throws made; career: 120 free throws made by Jim Spivey of Southeastern Oklahoma State (1954,55,56,57).
All-time leading scorers; first appearance: Dick Barnett, 3rd, Tennessee State (1956,57,58,59) 18 games, 186 field goals, 79 free throws, 451 total points 25.1 average per game, Charles Curtis, 8th, Pacific Lutheran (Wash.) (1956,57,58,59) 14 games 101 field goals,  85 free throws, 287 total points, 20.5 average per game, Roger Iverson, 20th, Pacific Lutheran (1956,57,58,59) 14 games, 109 field goals, 23 free throws, 241 total points, 17.2 average per game, and John Barnhill, 21st, Tennessee State (1956,57,58,59) 17 games, 104 field goals, 27 free throws, 235 total points, 13.8 average per game.
All-time leading scorer; second appearance: Bennie Swain, 6th Texas Southern (1955,56,57,58) 15 games, 119 field goals, 64 free throws, 302 total points, 20.1 average per game. 
All-time leading scorer; third appearance: James Spivey, 4th, Southeastern Oklahoma (1954,55,56,57) 13 games, 133 field goals, 120 free throws, 386 total points, 29.7 average per game.

Bracket

See also
 1956 NCAA basketball tournament
 1956 National Invitation Tournament

References

NAIA Men's Basketball Championship
Tournament
NAIA men's basketball tournament
NAIA men's basketball tournament